Robert Messer (18 July 1887 – 16 October 1918) was a Scottish professional footballer who played in the Football League for Leicester Fosse as an outside right. He was described as "a fine wing player who is very fast and centres well."

Personal life 
As of 1901, Messer was working as a printer's apprentice. He served as a private in the King's Own Scottish Borderers during the First World War and was killed in action near Ypres during the Battle of Courtrai on 16 October 1918. Messer is commemorated on the Tyne Cot Memorial. In 2011, Messer's British War Medal and Victory Medal were purchased by Leicester City; they are now exhibited in King Power Stadium's reception area.

Career statistics

References 

Scottish footballers
1918 deaths
British Army personnel of World War I
British military personnel killed in World War I
King's Own Scottish Borderers soldiers
Scottish Football League players
King's Park F.C. players
Footballers from Edinburgh
Association football outside forwards
Bo'ness F.C. players
Leicester City F.C. players
English Football League players
Broxburn United F.C. players
East Fife F.C. players
1887 births